Walmer is a closed railway station on the Molong–Dubbo railway line in New South Wales, Australia. The station opened in 1925 and closed in 1974.

References 

Disused regional railway stations in New South Wales
Railway stations in Australia opened in 1925
Railway stations closed in 1974
1974 disestablishments in Australia